Sargus is a genus of soldier flies in the family Stratiomyidae. There are at least 130 described species in Sargus.

Selected species

S. albibarbus Loew, 1855
S. aureopilosus McFadden, 1982
S. beppui Nagatomi, 1990
S. bipunctatus (Scopoli, 1763)
S. caeruleapex McFadden, 1982
S. consisus Wulp, 1896
S. elongatulus McFadden, 1982
S. evansi McFadden, 1982
S. decorus Say, 1824
S. cuprarius (Linnaeus, 1758)
S. cirrhosus McFadden, 1982
S. flavipes Meigen, 1822
S. harderseni Mason & Rozkosny, 2008
S. iridatus (Scopoli, 1763)
S. jaennickei Woodley, 2001
S. maculatus (Lindner, 1936)
S. persimilis McFadden, 1982
S. petersoni McFadden, 1982
S. punctatus McFadden, 1982
S. rufipes Wahlberg, 1854
S. transversus McFadden, 1982
S. yerbabuena Woodley, 2001

See also
 List of Sargus species

References

External links
 

Stratiomyidae
Diptera of Europe
Brachycera genera